The Volleyball Centre of Saint Petersburg, also known as Kazan Volleyball Centre, is a sports complex in Kazan, Russia. It's 13,000 square metres consists of two indoor arenas, a main with capacity for 5,000 spectators and a minor with capacity for 700 spectators. It is also equipped with supporting facilities such as gyms and conference rooms. It was opened in May 2010 and had a construction cost of 790 million rubles (US$26 million).

It is primarily used for volleyball and is the home arena of the VC Zenit-Kazan and Dinamo Kazan. The arena was one of the venues used in the 2013 Summer Universiade.

References

Indoor arenas in Russia
Volleyball venues in Russia
Sport in Kazan
Buildings and structures in Kazan
Sports venues completed in 2010
2010 establishments in Russia